The Pickle Juice Game  was an NFL regular season game between the Philadelphia Eagles and the Dallas Cowboys on September 3, 2000. The game is remembered for the Eagles use of pickle juice to help keep the team hydrated and prevent muscle cramps, due to the high temperatures in Texas that day. The outdoor temperature was recorded as high as 109 degrees with the field temperature measuring as high as 130 degrees. The Eagles would go on to dominate in the week one matchup winning the game 41-14, with running back Duce Staley rushing for 201 yards and the Eagles defense holding the Cowboys to 167 yards.

In 2008, Brigham Young University did a study which found that pickle juice could stop muscle cramps like it did in this game.

Box Score 
{{Americanfootballbox|titlestyle=text-align:center; |title=Philadelphia Eagles vs. Dallas Cowboys– Game summary|date=September 3, 2000|time=3:05 p.m. CST/4:05 p.m. EST|road=Eagles|R1=14|R2=10|R3=3|R4=14|home=Cowboys|H1=0|H2=6|H3=8|H4=0|stadium=Texas Stadium, Irving, Texas|attendance=62,872|weather=Clear, |referee=Tom White|TV=Fox|TVAnnouncers=Pat Summerall and John Madden|reference=|scoring=First quarter
PHI - Jeff Thomason 1 yard pass from Donovan McNabb (David Akers kick), 10:59.PHI- Duce Staley 1 yard rush (David Akers kick), 0:02 
Second quarter
PHI - Jeremiah Trotter 27 yard interception return (David Akers kick)
PHI - David Akers 33 yard field goal, 6:23.DAL - Tim Seder 34 yard field goal, 2:53.
DAL - Tim Seder 38 yard field goal, 0:00 Third quarterPHI - David Akers 37 yard field goal , 6:30.
Fourth quarter
PHI - Donovan McNabb 3 yard rush (David Akers kick), 14:56.PHI - Brian Mitchell 6 yard rush (David Akers kick), 12:22.
DAL - Joey Galloway 4 yard pass from Randall Cunningham (Rocket Ismail pass from Randall Cunningham), 6:45.''|stats=Top passersPHI – Donovan McNabb – 16/28, 130 yards, 1 TD, 2 INT
DAL – Randall Cunningham – 13/26, 135 yards, 1 TD, 1 INTTop rushersPHI – Duce Staley – 26 rushes, 201 yards, TD
DAL – Rocket Ismail – 2 rushes, 33 yardsTop receiversPHI – Duce Staley – 4 receptions, 61 yards
DAL – Joey Galloway – 4 receptions, 6 yards, TD}}

 Starting lineups 

 Officials 

 Referee: Tom White
 Umpire: Jim Quirk
 Down Judge: Ed Camp
 Line Judge: Gary Arthur
 Field Judge: Boris Cheek
 Side Judge: Tommy Moore
 Back Judge:''' Bob Waggoner

References 

2000 National Football League season
Philadelphia Eagles
Dallas Cowboys